Efthymis Koulouris (born 6 March 1996) is a Greek professional footballer who plays as a striker for Austrian Bundesliga club LASK and the Greece national team.

Koulouris began his career with PAOK, and spent time on loan at Cypriot First Division club Anorthosis and at Atromitos, with whom he was top scorer in the 2018–19 Super League. He joined Ligue 1 club Toulouse in 2019. Koulouris represented his country from under-17 to under-21 levels before making his senior debut in 2018.

Club career

PAOK
Koulouris was born in Skydra. He began his football career in PAOK's youth system as a young boy and came through the ranks, winning titles at under-17 and under-20 levels. He made his first-team debut as a 17-year-old on 13 February 2014 in the Greek Cup quarter-final against Apollon Smyrnis. With his side already 4–0 up on aggregate, Koulouris replaced Stefanos Athanasiadis at half-time in the second leg and scored twice. Three days later, he made his Super League debut as a late substitute against Asteras Tripolis.

Loan to Anorthosis
In the summer of 2015, Koulouris signed for Cypriot First Division club Anorthosis, on loan for the season. On 28 October, he scored six times as Anorthosis beat Second Division opponents Elpida Xylofagou 9–0 in the Cypriot Cup. His first league goal came four days later: having entered the match away to Pafos as an 88th-minute substitute, he scored with a header that secured a 2–1 win. Koulouris finished the season with seven goals in the Cup, which made him the top scorer in that season's competition, and six in the 2015–16 First Division.

Return to PAOK
He returned to PAOK for the 2016–17 season. On 19 September 2016, he scored both goals in a 2–1 away win against Asteras Tripolis and was elected MVP of the game. Koulouris established himself as a regular first-team player with 32 appearances in all competitions, and was voted Players' Young Player of the Year by his teammates.

On 29 September 2017, Koulouris agreed to a contract extension with PAOK until the summer of 2021. On 10 December, he scored in a 4–0 home win against rivals Panathinaikos. On 8 February 2018, he scored his first goal of the 2017–18 Greek Cup to help his club reach the semi-finals with a 5–1 aggregate win against Atromitos.

Loan to Atromitos
Koulouris joined Atromitos on loan for the 2018–19 season. On 26 July 2018, in his first competitive game, he scored a late goal against Dynamo Brest in the Europa League second qualifying round as Atromitos came back from 4–0 down to lose the first leg 4–3; they conceded a late equaliser in the second leg after Koulours had a goal disallowed and were eliminated. On 25 August, in his first Super League game of the 2018–19 season, he scored a brace sealing a 2–1 away win against rivals Panetolikos. On 7 October, he scored with a header sealing a 1–0 home win game against PAS Giannina. On 22 October, he scored a brace, including a late winner, in a 3–2 home win against Asteras Tripolis. Six days later he scored in a 2–2 away draw against Panionios. On 31 October, he scored in a 6–1 away Greek Cup win against Iraklis. On 25 November, he scored from the rebound after Azer Bušuladžić's shot was parried to give Atromitos the lead at home to Olympiacos, but they went on to lose 2–1. On 9 December, he scored a brace and gave an assist in a 4–2 home win against Aris Thessaloniki. He scored a hat trick against Apollon Smyrnis in the Greek Cup round of 16. On 27 January 2019, he opened the scoring in a 2–1 away loss against Lamia. On 31 January, he opened the score in an away 1–1 draw against OFI. On 31 March, he opened the score in a 2–1 away loss against Olympiacos.

His 18th goal of the season on 14 April in a 2–0 win away to Aris Thessaloniki confirmed that Atromitos would finish in fourth place. His 19th and last goal of the Super League season came the following week in a 2–0 win at home to Panathinaikos, a tally which made him the top scorer for the season. He became the first Atromitos player to finish as leading scorer in the top flight, and the first player to do so while on loan from another Greek club. He was the third player of Greek nationality to achieve the feat in the Super League era and, at 23 years and 60 days, the third-youngest player of all time to do so in the top division.

Toulouse
On 22 June 2019, Koulouris signed a four-year contract with French club Toulouse. L'Équipe reported the fee to be in the region of €3.5 million plus add-ons. In his first Ligue 1 game, away to Brest, he scored a somewhat fortunate 89th-minute equaliser. His third goal of the season was an even later equaliser, after 96 minutes of the match away to Metz on 28 September.

On 22 June 2021, he was released from the club, two years earlier than the contract he had signed, which was until the summer of 2023.

Return to Atromitos 
On 22 June 2021, only a few hours after he got released by Toulouse, he return to his previous club Atromitos, having signed a two-year contract. On 21 November 2021, Atromitos prevailed 2-0 rivals PAOK, with Koulouris being the main protagonist, as he opened the score in the 45th minute after an assist from Juan Muñiz, while in the 68th minute he scored with a penalty kick. He was voted man of the match for his performance. On 4 December 2021, he scored a brace in a 4-1 home win game against Apollon Smyrni, sealing a vital win in his club effort to avoid relegation.
On 10 February 2021, he scored a brace sealing a vital 3-1 win against Lamia, in his club effort to avoid relegation.
On 28 February 2022, he scored a brace sealing a vital 2-0 away win against Apollon Smyrnis in his club effort to avoid relegation. A week later, he scored with a header at the last minute of the game sealing a vital 2-1 home win game against Volos.

LASK
On 5 July 2022, LASK officially announced the signing of Koulouris on a three-year contract, for a fee over €1,000,000 plus bonuses, making him the most profitable sale of Atromitos.  He made his competitive debut for the club on the first matchday of the 2022–23 season, coming on as a substitute in the 61st minute for goalscorer Marin Ljubičić in a 3–1 home win against Austria Klagenfurt.

International career
On 16 March 2018, Michael Skibbe called up Koulouris in the Greece national team for the friendly match against Switzerland on 23 March 2018. On 23 March 2018, he made his debut with the Greece national team in a 1–0 home loss against Switzerland as a late substitute.

Career statistics

Club

Honours

Club
PAOK
Greek Cup: 2016–17, 2017–18 ; runner-up: 2013–14

Individual
 Super League Greece Top goalscorer : 2018–19 (19 goals)
Super League Greece Team of the Year: 2018–19
 Atromitos Player of the Year: 2021–22

References

External links

 
 
 

1996 births
Living people
Greek footballers
Association football forwards
Greece youth international footballers
Greece under-21 international footballers
Greece international footballers
Greek expatriate footballers
Super League Greece players
Cypriot First Division players
Austrian Football Bundesliga players
Ligue 1 players
Ligue 2 players
PAOK FC players
Anorthosis Famagusta F.C. players
Atromitos F.C. players
Toulouse FC players
LASK players
Expatriate footballers in Cyprus
Greek expatriate sportspeople in Cyprus
Expatriate footballers in France
Greek expatriate sportspeople in France
Expatriate footballers in Austria
Greek expatriate sportspeople in Austria
People from Skydra
Footballers from Central Macedonia